Idactus strandi is a species of beetle in the family Cerambycidae. It was described by Breuning in 1935.

References

Ancylonotini
Beetles described in 1935